The volcanic explosivity index (VEI) is a relative measure of the explosiveness of volcanic eruptions. It was devised by Christopher G. Newhall of the United States Geological Survey and Stephen Self in 1982.

Volume of products, eruption cloud height, and qualitative observations (using terms ranging from "gentle" to "mega-colossal") are used to determine the explosivity value. The scale is open-ended with the largest eruptions in history given a magnitude of 8. The scale is logarithmic, with each interval on the scale representing a tenfold increase in observed ejecta criteria, with the exception of between VEI-0, VEI-1 and VEI-2.

Classification
With indices running from 0 to 8, the VEI associated with an eruption is dependent on how much volcanic material is thrown out, to what height, and how long the eruption lasts. The scale is logarithmic from VEI-2 and up; an increase of 1 index indicates an eruption that is 10 times as powerful. As such, there is a discontinuity in the definition of the VEI between indices 1 and 2. In the following table, the frequency of each VEI indicates the approximate frequency of new eruptions of that VEI or higher.

About 40 eruptions of VEI-8 magnitude within the last 132 million years (Mya) have been identified, of which 30 occurred in the past 36 million years. Considering the estimated frequency is on the order of once in 50,000 years, there are likely many such eruptions in the last 132 Mya that are not yet known. Based on incomplete statistics, other authors assume that at least 60 VEI-8 eruptions have been identified. The most recent is Lake Taupō's Oruanui eruption, more than 27,000 years ago, which means that there have not been any Holocene eruptions with a VEI of 8.

There have been at least 10 eruptions of VEI-7 in the last 11,700 years. There are also 58 Plinian eruptions, and 13 caldera-forming eruptions, of large, but unknown magnitudes. By 2010, the Global Volcanism Program of the Smithsonian Institution had cataloged the assignment of a VEI for 7,742 volcanic eruptions that occurred during the Holocene (the last 11,700 years) which account for about 75% of the total known eruptions during the Holocene. Of these 7,742 eruptions, about 49% have a VEI of 2 or lower, and 90% have a VEI of 3 or lower.

Limitations
Under the VEI, ash, lava, lava bombs, and ignimbrite are all treated alike. Density and vesicularity (gas bubbling) of the volcanic products in question is not taken into account. In contrast, the DRE (dense-rock equivalent) is sometimes calculated to give the actual amount of magma erupted. Another weakness of the VEI is that it does not take into account the power output of an eruption, which makes the VEI extremely difficult to determine with prehistoric or unobserved eruptions.

Although VEI is quite suitable for classifying the explosive magnitude of eruptions, the index is not as significant as sulfur dioxide emissions in quantifying their atmospheric and climatic impact.

Lists of notable eruptions

 Timeline of volcanism on Earth (mostly VEI-6, within 2 kya)
 List of volcanic eruptions 1500–1999
 List of volcanic eruptions in the 21st century
 List of volcanic eruptions by death toll
 List of large Holocene volcanic eruptions (VEI-5–7, or plume height of at least 30 km)
 List of large volcanic eruptions (mostly VEI-6–8, within 50 Mya)
 List of largest volcanic eruptions (VEI-7–8, mostly within 500 Mya)

See also
  
 
 
 Lists of volcanoes
 List of natural disasters by death toll

References

External links
 VEI glossary entry from a USGS website
 How to measure the size of a volcanic eruption, from The Guardian
 The size and frequency of the largest explosive eruptions on Earth, a 2004 article from the Bulletin of Volcanology
 List of Large Holocene Eruptions (VEI > 4) from the Smithsonian Global Volcanism Program 

Volcanology
Hazard scales
1982 introductions